This article lists the power stations in Angola.

Legend

Natural gas 
List of all natural gas power plants in Angola.

Hydroelectric 
List of all hydroelectric power plants in Angola.

Solar

See also 

 List of power stations in Africa
 List of largest power stations in the world

References 

Angola
Power stations in Angola
Power stations